Siffert is a Swiss surname. Notable people with the surname include:

Emmanuel Siffert (born 1967), Swiss conductor
Jo Siffert (1936–1971), Swiss racing driver

Surnames of Swiss origin